Slaves of Destiny is a 1924 British silent drama film directed by Maurice Elvey and starring Matheson Lang, Valia and Henry Victor. It is based on the 1899 novel Miranda of the Balcony by A.E.W. Mason.

Cast
 Matheson Lang as Luke Charnock 
 Valia as Miranda Warriner 
 Henry Victor as Ralph Warriner 
 Humberston Wright as Hassan 
 Harry Agar Lyons as Wilbrahim

References

External links

1924 films
British silent feature films
1924 drama films
1920s English-language films
Films directed by Maurice Elvey
British drama films
British black-and-white films
Films based on British novels
1920s British films
Silent drama films